This is a list of islands and other locations in the Pirates of the Caribbean film series.

Davy Jones' Locker

Davy Jones' Locker, based on a real superstition of the same name, is a fictional place introduced in Dead Man's Chest and featured prominently in At World's End. The Locker is similar to purgatory, and is the destination for souls that die at sea. Davy Jones was entrusted with the task of ferrying the souls of the deceased into the next world by the goddess Calypso.

After Jack Sparrow is killed by the Kraken at the end of Dead Man's Chest, Calypso organizes a mission to rescue his soul from the Locker back to the land of the living. In At World's End, Calypso is accompanied by Elizabeth Swann, Will Turner, and Hector Barbossa, among others. They reach the Locker by the use of magical charts leading to World's End. Sao Feng, one of the nine Pirate Lords, was the previous owner of these charts.

After the crew reach the Locker, they find Jack and the Black Pearl stranded in the desert. Jack, unable to move the ship, has begun to hallucinate. The ship is transported to the ocean by many crabs under the control of Calypso. While on the ocean, the crew see the ghost of Governor Weatherby Swann, who has been murdered on the orders of Cutler Beckett. By deciphering the clues on Sao Feng's charts, Jack discovers the way to escape the Locker. At sunset, the crew capsizes the ship; this triggers a green flash and returns the Pearl to the world of the living, effectively reviving Jack.

The arid plain where the Black Pearl is beached was filmed at the Bonneville Salt Flats in Utah. The shore where the Pearl re-enters the ocean was filmed at the Guadalupe-Nipomo Dunes in California.

Isla Cruces 

Isla Cruces is a fictional tropical island introduced in Dead Man's Chest. It is the place where Davy Jones buried the eponymous 'Dead Man's Chest', which contains his beating heart; stabbing the heart is the only way to kill Jones.

The island appears to have been abandoned; the previous occupants are unknown, but there are crumbling buildings indicating that it was once inhabited. On the island, Jack Sparrow, Will Turner, and James Norrington duel for control of the chest. Norrington escapes with the chest, and gives it to Cutler Beckett in exchange for a full pardon.

It is not revealed in the film why Davy Jones buried the Chest on Isla Cruces. However, the film's writers, Ted Elliott and Terry Rossio, imply in the Pirates of the Caribbean: Dead Man's Chest DVD audio commentary, that Jones chose it because it is a plague island that remains deserted.

The ruined church, graveyard, and mill were filmed in Vieille Case, Dominica. The beach where Norrington, Sparrow, and Turner duel was filmed near Little Exuma in The Bahamas.

Isla de Muerta
Isla de Muerta is a mysterious island featured in The Curse of the Black Pearl where the titular Black Pearls pirate crew hide their looted treasure. It is revealed to be the location of the Aztec treasure that has cursed Hector Barbossa and his crew.

According to Jack Sparrow, Isla de Muerta is an island that cannot be found, except by those who already know where it is hidden. From the air, the island resembles a human skull. Mysteriously shrouded in fog, the isle is surrounded by a graveyard of sunken ships; its waters swarm with hammerhead sharks and shoaling fish. The island contains a series of connected caves, which contain the crew's loot and the Chest of Cortes.

Before the events of the film, Barbossa leads a mutiny against Jack Sparrow and becomes the captain of the Black Pearl. Later, the crew finds cursed Aztec treasure on Isla de Muerta. By removing the golden medallions from their chest, the crew become undead and lose the ability to feel physical pleasure. In order to remove the curse, the crew collect the medallions and return them.

Barbossa, believing that Elizabeth Swann is the key to breaking his curse, kidnaps her and brings her to Isla de Muerta. Captain Sparrow uses his magical compass, which points to the thing the user wants most, to follow him. With the help of Will Turner, Elizabeth, and Jack fight against the pirates in the caves under the island. James Norrington and his men fight against Barbossa's crew in the bay just offshore. By using Will's blood, the curse is broken and Jack kills Barbossa.

In Dead Man's Chest, it's learned that the island was reclaimed by the sea, taking with it both the cursed Aztec treasure and the mountains of gold that Barbossa's crew had hoarded while they were cursed. It was with this gold that Jack Sparrow had agreed to pay his new crew.

Isla de Pelegosto 

Isla de Pelegosto, also known as Cannibal Island, is a fictional Caribbean island.

In Dead Man's Chest, Bootstrap Bill, acting as Davy Jones's agent, delivers the Black Spot to Captain Jack Sparrow, a mark indicating that his blood debt to Jones is due. To avoid the monstrous Kraken that is hunting him, Jack commands the crew of the Black Pearl to land as fast as possible. They alight on Pelegosto, a typical Caribbean island with sandy beaches and lush, mountainous jungles; despite its paradise-like appearance, it is inhabited by a vicious cannibal tribe that captures the Pearls crew. They believe Jack Sparrow is a god in human form and intend to eat him to "release him from his fleshy prison." Will Turner arrives and helps them escape.

Jack seeks out Tia Dalma, an obeah woman, for help. Dalma lives in a shack on the other side of the island. Jack trades Barbossa's undead monkey for a jar of dirt, which she claims will protect him from Davy Jones. After Jack's death at the hands of the Kraken, his crew return to Dalma's shack on Pelegosto. Dalma reveals that she has resurrected Barbossa, and they will lead a mission to rescue Jack from Davy Jones's Locker.

Scenes set on the island were filmed on Dominica. The Pelegosto tribe's main village was built south of the island's capital, Roseau. Other scenes were filmed in Morne Trois Pitons National Park and Indian River.

Port Royal 
Port Royal is a major harbor in the Caribbean. It is based on the historical Port Royal, a city located at the end of the Palisadoes at the mouth of the Kingston Harbour, in southeastern Jamaica. Port Royal appears in all movies except On Stranger Tides.

Elizabeth Swann arrives in Port Royal as a child, after her father Weatherby Swann is appointed governor. In the first film, Will Turner works in the town as a blacksmith's apprentice. Port Royal is attacked by the crew of the Black Pearl after Elizabeth accidentally summons the pirates. Pintel and Ragetti kidnap Elizabeth from her mansion, which is located in the town. Jack is imprisoned in the jail there, but Will Turner helps him escape.

In Dead Man's Chest, Cutler Beckett uses Port Royal as his base of operations.

Scenes set in the harbor of Port Royal were filmed at Wallilabou Bay, Saint Vincent and the Grenadines. Today, those sets are still standing for tourist to come and visit. A replica of Fort Charles was built on the Palos Verdes Peninsula near Los Angeles, as was Governor Swann's mansion. The scenes set inside the mansion were filmed in Manhattan Beach, California.

Rum-runner's Isle
Rum-runner's Isle is a small island where Jack Sparrow was left stranded prior to the events of The Curse of the Black Pearl.

Before the events of the first film, Barbossa leads a mutiny against Jack and strands him on this unnamed island. He leaves Jack a pistol holding a single shot; he could use this to commit suicide before starving to death. For many years, Barbossa assumes that Jack has died; he is surprised to learn of his survival during the events of the first film. Jack repeatedly claims that he used a raft made of sea turtles and his own back hair to escape the island. In reality, the island was a haven for rum-runners. Jack discovers their stash of liquor, lies on a beach drinking rum for three days, and barters passage off the isle when the bootleggers return.

During The Curse of the Black Pearl, Barbossa captures Elizabeth Swann and Jack. Will Turner barters for their safety. Barbossa uses a loophole in their agreement to maroon Elizabeth and Jack on the same island. Elizabeth burns the stash of rum in order to create a signal fire, and they are rescued by James Norrington.

A similar island appears in On Stranger Tides, though is unknown if it is the same island, it has black marks on the sand, likely ash, and some trees on the center of the island.

The scenes on Rum-runner's Isle were filmed in Petit Tabac, one of five islands known as the Tobago Cays, in Saint Vincent and the Grenadines.

Shipwreck Cove

Shipwreck Cove is an inlet on the fictional Shipwreck Island, appearing in At World's End. Shipwreck Cove is considered to be an impregnable fortress, well-supplied, and able to withstand nearly any siege. It serves as the meeting place for the Brethren Court, which is a gathering of the world's nine Pirate Lords.

The Fourth Brethren Court meet to discuss the threat of the East India Trading Company (EITC) and the ways in which to combat this threat. Barbossa insists that the Court must free Calypso, a sea goddess who was trapped in human form by the first Brethren Court. Sparrow and Elizabeth prefer to fight directly against the EITC. Elizabeth is elected Pirate King by the Court, and she declares war on Cutler Beckett.

The Pirate's Code is kept at Shipwreck Cove. This rulebook serves as the source of law for all pirates. Jack Sparrow's father, Captain Teague, is the Keeper of the Code.

Scenes set on Shipwreck Island were filmed in Dominica.

Singapore
The fictionalised Singapore is filled with bridge-covered waterways and crude wooden buildings, and differs markedly from the actual historical Singapore. The sets for the bathhouse, harbor, and stilt houses were constructed at Universal Studios in Los Angeles.

In At World's End, Hector Barbossa and Elizabeth Swann visit Sao Feng to steal his navigational charts, which lead to World's End. They request a ship and a crew to rescue Jack Sparrow from Davy Jones's Locker. Sao Feng has captured Will Turner, who attempted to steal the charts from Feng. After a tense standoff, the pirates form a temporary alliance when they are attacked by Ian Mercer and the East India Trading Company. After a series of skirmishes and negotiations, Feng grants them a ship and a crew.

Tortuga 

Tortuga is an island off the northern coast of Saint-Domingue (Haiti), out of the jurisdiction of the Royal Navy and the East India Trading Company. While it remains a free port where traders can escape the high East India tariffs, it is a dangerous one where illegal transactions are common.

In the first film, Captain Jack Sparrow and Will Turner moor their stolen ship, the Interceptor, in Tortuga to recruit a crew. Their crew included Joshamee Gibbs, Anamaria, Cotton, and Marty. Here, Jack also encounters Giselle and Scarlett, with whom he has had past romantic relationships.

In Dead Man's Chest, Will goes to Tortuga to hunt for Jack Sparrow. A denizen tells Will that he saw a ship with black sails (the Black Pearl) beached on Pelegosto. Jack returns to Tortuga to try to enlist 99 unsuspecting sailors to pay off his blood debt to Davy Jones. Although he falls far short of his goal, the new crew proves useful during the final confrontation with the Kraken. Jack is reunited with Elizabeth Swann while in Tortuga and also recruits the disgraced James Norrington, who resigned his commission after losing his ship in a hurricane.

At the conclusion of At World's End, Barbossa leaves Jack and Gibbs in Tortuga by once again hijacking the Black Pearl. Gibbs remains in Tortuga with Giselle and Scarlett.

At the end of On Stranger Tides, Barbossa is in command of Blackbeard's ship, the Queen Anne's Revenge. He yells out that they will travel back to Tortuga, although this is not shown onscreen.

Scenes set in Tortuga were filmed in Wallilabou Bay, St. Vincent and the Grenadines.

See also
 Locations in prequel series
 List of fictional islands

References

Locations
Fictional islands
Fictional locations by series
Disney-related lists
Pirates of the Caribbean
Fictional places in Disney films